There are two amphoe (districts) named Mae Tha in Thailand, which, however, have two different Thai spellings
Amphoe Mae Tha, Lampang province (แม่ทะ)
Amphoe Mae Tha, Lamphun province (แม่ทา)

Mae Tha